The Vector WX-8 was a sports car prototype manufactured by Vector Motors. It was first unveiled at the 2007 LA Auto Show, revealing the development and the company's ambitious intentions of creating a next generation sports car successor to their previous models. This engine was described variously on the company's website as being capable of "1800+ HP", "1850+ HP", and "over 1250 horsepower".

As of August 2018, Vector Motors reportedly was still actively developing the vehicle. It was reported that the company seeks to sell two Vector WX-3 prototypes for US$3.5 million to secure further funding of development operations. Vector's website announced the WX-8 will be equipped with a choice of two potential engines: a 10.0 liter big-block V-8 or an electric/hybrid 7.0 liter small-block V-8. The car was not complete by the time of designer Gerald Wiegert's death in early 2021, with an incomplete prototype model sitting on Wiegert's driveway.

References

External links 
(archived) Vector WX-8 specs

Vector Motors
Rear mid-engine, rear-wheel-drive vehicles
Concept cars